Alan Louis Keato (7 September 1920 – 16 December 1943) was an Australian rugby league footballer who played in the New South Wales Rugby League for Western Suburbs. He died during the Second World War.

Early life and rugby career
Keato was born on 7 September 1920 in Kogarah to William and Annie Keato. He played 5 matches for Western Suburbs in 1943, the same club for which his brother Bill had played.

Military career
Keato enlisted in the Second Australian Imperial Force on 10 February 1943. Rising to become a lance-bombardier, he died of accidental injuries at Lae during the New Guinea campaign on 16 December 1943. He was buried at Lae War Cemetery.

Career statistics

References

1920 births
1943 deaths
Accidental deaths in Papua New Guinea
Australian Army personnel of World War II
Australian Army soldiers
Australian military personnel killed in World War II
Australian rugby league players
Rugby league players from New South Wales
Rugby league second-rows
Western Suburbs Magpies players